Florina is a given name. 

Some persons with the name:
 Florina Alías (1921-1999), Spanish writer in Asturian language
 Florina Herea (born 1979), a Romanian freestyle swimmer 
 Florina Kaja (born 1982), a reality television participant
 Florina Pașcalău (born 1982), a Romanian basketball center
 Florina Pana (born 1973), a Romanian long-distance runner
 Florina Bârsan-Chintoan (born 1985), a Romanian handball player
 Florina Rodov (born 1982), a Russian-American writer

See also 
 

Romanian feminine given names